Freakazoid! is an American superhero comedy animated television series created by Bruce Timm and Paul Dini and developed by Tom Ruegger for the Kids' WB programming block of The WB. The series chronicles the adventures of the title character, Freakazoid, a crazy teenage superhero who battles with a bizarre array of supervillains. It also featured mini-episodes of adventures of other bizarre superheroes. The series was produced by Warner Bros. Animation and Amblin Television. The cartoon was the third animated series produced by the collaboration of Steven Spielberg and Warner Bros. Animation, following Tiny Toon Adventures and The Plucky Duck Show. 

Bruce Timm, best known as a major principal of the DC Animated Universe, originally intended it to be a straightforward superhero action-adventure cartoon with comic overtones, but executive producer Steven Spielberg asked series producer and writer Tom Ruegger and the Animaniacs team to turn Freakazoid! into a flat-out comedy. The show is similar to fellow Ruegger-led programs such as Animaniacs, and the humor is unique in its inclusions of slapstick, fourth wall firings, parody, surreal humor and pop cultural references.

The series was one of the first to debut on the new Kids' WB Saturday morning block of The WB, on September 9, 1995. The series lasted for two seasons, finishing with 24 episodes, the final one broadcast on June 1, 1997. Although the series originally struggled in the ratings, reruns on Cartoon Network and a fan following elevated it to become a cult hit. Warner Bros. considered renewing the series for a third season, but deemed it to be too expensive. The show also ranked #53 on IGN's Top 100 Animated Series list.

Background
The show's title character is the superhero alter ego of geeky 16-year-old (later changed to 17-year-old) Dexter Douglas who attends Harry Connick High School. His name is an allusion to the alliterative names that superheroes commonly have. Dexter gained his abilities from a computer bug activated by a "secret key sequence" that was accidentally activated by his cat Mr. Chubbikins (a reference to the Pentium FDIV bug). The sequence of keys is "@[=g3,8d]\&fbb=-q]/hk%fg" (the quotes are included) which also activated when Dexter hit the delete button on his computer. Freakazoid has enhanced strength and endurance, extraordinary speed and agility, as well as access to all the knowledge on the Internet. These make him a powerful and fearsome force for upholding freedom and righteousness, unless he gets distracted by something like a bear riding a motorcycle. He has a base called the Freakalair, a parody of the Batcave, built by his mute butler Ingmar. The Freakalair contains a "Hall of Nifty Things to Know" and even a mad scientist lab. His greatest weakness, as he once explained to Guitierrez, is graphite bars charged with negative ions. He also expresses a great aversion to "poo gas".

Peripheral powers come and go: Freakazoid once developed telekinesis triggered by anger that was never mentioned again after the episode, and once crossed the globe to yell at a Tibetan monk for raking too loudly, but apologizes to him later in the same plot. He also has the ability to assume the form of electricity and cover long distances instantaneously, although he just as often simply sticks his arms forward and runs while making swooshing sounds with his mouth, pretending to fly.

Dexter can change into and out of Freakazoid at will with the words "Freak out!" and "Freak in!". When not in Freakazoid mode, Dexter looks and acts completely normal, and his family is unaware that anything has happened to him. Freakazoid spends this time in an area of Dexter's brain called the Freakazone, where he reflects, has profound thoughts, and watches Rat Patrol reruns.

While the show's setting is set around Washington, D.C., the locale often varies with the show's humor, taking Freakazoid to locations around the world as needed.

Episodes

Characters
 Freakazoid (voiced by Paul Rugg) – The protagonist of the series. He is the alter ego of geeky 16-year-old computer ace Dexter Douglas (voiced by David Kaufman), who became Freakazoid from an overloaded Pinnacle chip inside his computer and hitting the delete button. He attends Harry Connick High School. To transform into Freakazoid, Dexter says "Freak out!" To change back into Dexter, Freakazoid says "Freak in!" Dexter and Freakazoid sometimes identify as separate identities, and other times are considered the same person. Catchphrase: "Aw, nut bunnies!" His image and "Freak Out!" superpower are parodies of the comic book superhero Shazam.

The Douglas family
 Duncan Douglas (voiced by Googy Gress) – Dexter's older brother. He is a bully towards Dexter and is portrayed as a caricature of a high school jock. Duncan is also frequently tormented by Freakazoid should Dexter transform somewhere near him.

 Debbie Douglas (voiced by Tress MacNeille) – Dexter's mother. She is unaware that her son is Freakazoid and is generally blithe and clueless.

 Douglas Douglas (voiced by John P. McCann) – Dexter's father who is incredibly incompetent, but attempts to keep his family in line anyway.

 Mr. Chubbikins (vocal effects provided by Frank Welker) – The Douglas' morbidly obese cat. He jumped on Dexter's keyboard while chasing a butterfly, accidentally typing in the key sequence which activated the Pinnacle chip's flaw, turning Dexter into Freakazoid.

Allies
 Sgt. Mike Cosgrove (voiced by Ed Asner) – A heavyset, gruff police sergeant with a heart of gold who is friends with Freakazoid and several other characters. By pointing at something and saying "Cut it out", he has the almost supernatural ability to get people to stop whatever they are doing on command, no matter what they may be doing at the time. Cosgrove also possesses the odd power of finding Freakazoid no matter where he is, and often interrupts his heroic endeavors to ask him to visit various entertainments, which Freakazoid always enthusiastically agrees to no matter what he is doing at the time. During this visit, Cosgrove inevitably reveals important information about the plot of the episode, resulting in Freakazoid leaving to foil the villain's scheme and Cosgrove being left to enjoy the attraction for himself.

 Roddy MacStew (voiced by Craig Ferguson) – Freakazoid's mentor, and expositionist; an ill-tempered Scotsman who once worked for Guitierrez. He first found that the Pinnacle Chip was flawed. In "The Chip" (detailing how Freakazoid gained his powers), he was trapped in the Internet after going into it to escape from Guitierrez's minions, but was later forced out by Guitierrez and resumed his mentor role. His favorite word is "Crud!"

 Steff (voiced by Tracy Rowe) – Freakazoid's perky and sweet yet cynical and sarcastic blonde girlfriend; her real name is Stephanie. She discovers Freakazoid's secret identity when Cosgrove accidentally points it out aloud in "Mission: Freakazoid".

 Hans (voiced by Larry Cedar) – A mysterious agent with a Western European accent who takes Freakazoid to Professor Heiney's lab.

 Professor Heiney (voiced by Ed Gilbert) – A scientist with a lab in the mountains who Freakazoid sometimes goes to for help. He researches and kills monsters, and is often attacked by them.

 Ingmar – Freakazoid's mute butler, who built and maintains the Freakalair. He quit in "Mission: Freakazoid" to become a rodeo clown and was replaced by Professor Jones. He is a parody of Zorro's mute manservant Bernardo and Batman's butler Alfred Pennyworth.

 Professor Jones (voiced by Jonathan Harris) – A snooty and cowardly parody of Dr. Zachary Smith from Lost in Space (who was also portrayed by Harris). He is the replacement to Ingmar and is old friends with him. Jones does not get along with Cosgrove well and gets little respect from Freakazoid or anyone else. A running gag is that someone would ask if he was on that show with a kid and a robot which is a nod to Jonathan Harris' work on Lost in Space.

 Joe Leahy (voiced by himself) – The show's very vocal narrator and announcer who sometimes gets more involved than the job usually requires.

 Freakazette – Only mentioned in the first episode for a brief verse during the "Freakazoid and Friends" theme song (set to the same tune as the Animaniacs theme).

 Foamy the Freakadog (vocal effects provided by Frank Welker) – A vicious, rabid dog which Freakazoid freed from the dogcatcher's van. Foamy is painted blue, has a Freakazoid costume (complete with hair), and is prone to maul and/or beat Freakazoid due to his rabid condition.

 Handman (voiced by Paul Rugg) – Freakazoid's brief "right hand man", who is just a painted face on his right hand and has great difficulty pronouncing Freakazoid's name correctly. He fell in love with and married Handgirl, a painted face on Freakazoid's left hand.

 Expendable Lad (voiced by Paul Dini) – Freakazoid's brief sidekick in "And Fanboy Is His Name". He was hospitalized due to Milk Man bruising his clavicle and subsequently released from Freakazoid's service.

 Leonard Maltin (voiced by himself) – He was kidnapped by Dr. Mystico during the episode "Island of Dr. Mystico", while Maltin was giving his opinion of the same episode. Freakazoid points out that Mystico's prisoners all have superpowers, and Maltin's is that he knows every movie ever made.

 Henry Kissinger (voiced by Maurice LaMarche) – A politician who was kidnapped by Dr. Mystico's "orangu-men". In the show, he speaks in a low, groggy, incomprehensible mumble. He is also briefly mentioned in "Two Against Freak".

 Norm Abram (voiced by himself) – A master carpenter who was kidnapped by the Lobe to make a wooden instrument to destroy Freakazoid, but got free and helped turn the tables against the Lobe and his allies.

Enemies
Freakazoid! features a number of campy villains. They consist of:

 The Lobe (voiced by David Warner) – Freakazoid's archenemy, an evil genius whose entire head is a giant brain. Despite his high intellect, he has very low self-esteem, once even having a scheme foiled by Freakazoid simply insulting the plan, despite actually being impressed by it. No background information of any kind is given for the Lobe and his real name is never revealed.

 The Cobra Queen (voiced by Tress MacNeille) – Audrey Manatee is a former shoplifter whose theft of an experimental expired cosmetic that was left in the sunlight too long which she applied to her face has transformed her into a cobra woman with command over snakes and other reptiles. In later episodes, Cave Guy and the Cobra Queen are a couple. She has a lair in the sewers and often complained about the lack of light until Freakazoid suggested getting Japanese lanterns. Cobra Queen seems to be offended when compared to Sylvester the Cat.

 Cave Guy (voiced by Jeff Bennett impersonating Jim Backus) – Royce Mumphry is a thuggish blue-skinned caveman with upperclass diction and taste who speaks in a stereotypical WASP tone (see Locust Valley lockjaw). He subscribes to The New Yorker. Cave Guy also seems to have an odd fear of Klingons, possibly because of the made-up language they use.

 Longhorn (voiced by Maurice LaMarche) – Jubal "Bull" Nixon was once an employee of the Johnny Cat cat litter company until he turned to a life of crime. Because he was searched for by law enforcement so frequently, he had plastic surgery to turn himself into a humanoid Texas Longhorn. Freakazoid pointed out that this did not prevent Longhorn from appearing on America's Most Wanted every week. He loves country music and despite being a lousy songwriter is determined to get a recording contract in Nashville. Longhorn also owns a massive truck nicknamed "Bessie Mae" which is outfitted with all kinds of devices.
 Turk (voiced by Matt Landers) – Longhorn's henchman.

 Armando Guitierrez (voiced by Ricardo Montalbán) – The eyepatch-wearing man whose company Apex Microchips (not to be confused with Apex Digital) designed the faulty Pinnacle Chip responsible for Freakazoid's creation as well as him being Freakazoid's first enemy. He is similar to Khan from Star Trek (who was also played by Montalbán). Originally a normal human, he briefly gained powers similar to Freakazoid's by exploiting the Pinnacle chip's flaw. By "Hero Boy", he appears in a hooded robe to cover the cybernetics that are over the injuries on the left side of his head after Freakazoid knocked him into a cyber-pit. Guitierrez hates being called a weenie to which he will angrily respond "I am not a weenie! It is YOU who are the weenie!". In "Normadeus", he is among the villains invited by the Lobe to witness the destruction of Freakazoid as the Lobe mentioned that he never got to be in an episode with him.
 Jocko (voiced by Paul Rugg) – Guitierrez's henchman, who is completely inarticulate.

 Candle Jack (voiced by Jeff Bennett) – A supernatural villain with a burlap sack over his head who abducts anyone who says his name a- 

 Waylon Jeepers (voiced by Jeff Bennett) – A creepy little man from Venice Beach who created the Medusa Watch which can turn people (and pigeons) into stone. He has also created a similar device that turned beavers into gold. He is obsessed with all things supernatural and is well acquainted with several monsters including Dracula, the Wolf Man, and the Loch Ness Monster. Additionally, his schemes seem to deeply infuriate Freakazoid and Jeepers is shown to be the only villain that Freakazoid genuinely does not like (whereas the rest of the villains appear to have a friendly relationship with Freakazoid off-battle), once going on a long (and unscripted) rant against him after he tried to show him the Medusa Watch. His name is a play on famous country guitarist Waylon Jennings.
 Vorn the Unspeakable (voiced by Richard Moll) – A Cthulhu-like demon summoned by Jeepers using a book entitled How to Summon Monsters the E-Z Way.

 Invisibo (voiced by Corey Burton impersonating Vincent Price) – Ahmon Kor-Unch is an invisible, smart-mouthed pharaoh who is only visible via the staff he carries. He was sealed away inside a sarcophagus in the ancient past, but freed in the modern day after Dexter and Duncan accidentally broke the seal on the sarcophagus while fighting. Invisibo planned to absorb power from the local power plant to become unstoppable, but was defeated by Freakazoid who destroyed his staff, allowing him to be locked back into his sarcophagus and taken away by authorities. Invisibo resurfaced in "Normadeus" where is among the villains invited by the Lobe to witness the destruction of Freakazoid. Through an unknown method, he regained his invisibility.

 Booger Beast (voiced by Frank Welker) – A slimy monster who attacks Steff in the cold opening of episode 9.

 The Nerdator (voiced by Aron Kincaid) – A man who planned to kidnap all of the nerds in the world and absorb their knowledge to become a "Super-Nerd". However, Freakazoid convinced him of the downsides of being a nerd, after which he discontinued his plot and instead began kidnapping "good-looking, but vapid airheads". His character design is a parody of the Predator.

 Arms Akimbo (voiced by John Schuck impersonating Edward G. Robinson) – A spoiled model turned extortionist who, after years of posing, was left with his arms frozen in a jaunty pose with his hands on his hips. He sells "oops insurance", a form of protection racketeering which mainly consists of him breaking things of value before comically following it up with a small "Oops".

 The Milk Man – Only shown/mentioned in the episode "And Fanboy Is His Name". He is shown on a news report in a battle with Freakazoid and his then-sidekick Expendable Lad. As the name implies, he uses milk as his theme and has a milk gun.

 Deadpan (voiced by Bebe Neuwirth) – A plain-looking female supervillain with a monotonous voice. She is a shapeshifter who once tried to conquer Washington by transforming into Freakazoid, but this plan was quickly foiled when the real Freakazoid appeared and nonchalantly pointed her out. She had only one appearance in the cold opening for "The Wrath of Guitierrez".

 Mary Beth (voiced by Tress MacNeille) – Cosgrove's former girlfriend, a cosmetics executive and monster. She is short-tempered and when angered turns green, develops a deep raspy voice, and shoots fire from her nose. She has allegedly existed since the beginning of time, and planned to steal Freakazoid's hero essence to remain immortal but was foiled and, as a result, died and shriveled into a pile of dust. Her name is a play on cosmetics giant Mary Kay.

 Janos Ivnovels (voiced by Jim Cummings) – The ruthless dictator of Vuka Nova and its Minister of State Security. He is responsible for capturing Freakazoid's family (and the mime from Animaniacs) and imprisoning them in Chesky Beresch Prison, the toughest prison in Europe. He and his subordinate Colonel Anton Mohans were defeated after Freakazoid and his friends rescued the Douglas family and mime, and last seen being tortured by the mime and his pals.
 Colonel Anton Mohans (voiced by Larry Cedar) – A vicious thug who finds torture relaxing.

 Dr. Mystico (voiced by Tim Curry) – A mad scientist who lives on a remote island and experiments with the native orangutans. He was kicked out of university for his mad science, and thus set up a laboratory on an island to continue his experiments. He seeks to take over the world, though he always seems to say Cleveland instead.
 Sparkles - Dr. Mystico's pet white cat. He is similar to the cat that is owned by Ernst Stavro Blofeld.
 Orangu-Men (vocal effects provided by Jim Cummings) - A group of creatures created by Dr. Mystico by splicing the DNA of humans and orangutans. Three of them, Fatima, Ackbar, and Ringo, serve as his henchmen.

 Kid Carrion (voiced by Jeff Bennett) – A zombie cowboy who was appeared in "Relax-o-Vision" and "The Lobe". He can be seen in the opening credits standing next to Candle Jack. He seems to be a parody of the villain Tex Hex from Bravestarr, but also resembles the Scarecrow from Bruce Timm's The New Batman Adventures.

 Eye-of-Newt – A strange one-eyed creature resembling Newt Gingrich, whose name is a reference to Shakespeare's Macbeth ("Eye of newt and toe of frog..."). He has no dialogue and is a background villain, although it seems that he is frequently captured by heroes like Freakazoid or the Huntsman.

Other characters
 Mo-Ron/Bo-Ron (voiced by Stan Freberg) – An obese and dimwitted alien from the planet Barone's. His name was later changed to Bo-Ron to appease network censors' concerns that use of the word moron might be offensive. He is a parody of Ro-Man, the alien monster from Robot Monster. His first appearance was when he tried to deliver Earth an important message, only to forget what it was. This message turned out to be a comet heading towards Earth, which caused everyone to flee the area. He also appeared in the episode "Next Time, Phone Ahead!", a parody of E.T. The Extra-Terrestrial. In "Freak-a-Panel", he was among the characters that confront Freakazoid over being dropped from the show, and was given a job washing the Freakmobile.

 Fanboy (voiced by Stephen Furst) – An obese, acne-stricken, socially awkward fanboy (hence his name) and would-be sidekick to Freakazoid who obsesses over various media. Fanboy's age is never specified; he could be anywhere between his late teens to early 30s. In "Freak-a-Panel", he was among the characters that confront Freakazoid over being dropped from the show, and was given a job washing the Freakmobile.

 Bill Clinton and Hillary Clinton (voiced by Frank Welker and Tress MacNeille respectively) make frequent cameos in the show, partly because of its setting of Washington, D.C.

 Barbra Streisand (voiced by Tress MacNeille) also makes a number of appearances, most notably in the episode "Dexter's Date", which features a parody of Hello, Dolly!.

 Hero Boy (voiced by John P. McCann) – The title character from Freakazoid's favorite TV show, a parody of Astro Boy. He has no powers (save for flying) and is invariably shrugged off by the monsters he fights, as his pathetic fighting techniques (consisting of weakly pounding on enemies) always fail miserably.

 Steven Spielberg (voiced by Frank Welker) – The show's executive producer. His most notable appearance was in "The Freakazoid", where Freakazoid, the Brain from Pinky and the Brain, and Wakko Warner from Animaniacs get into a disagreement over which of their shows he likes best, only for Spielberg to reveal that he has no idea who they are. In "The Nerdator", he is among the nerds captured by the Nerdator. During this time, he was directing a sequel to E.T. the Extra-Terrestrial called E.T. Returns.

 Paul Harvey (voiced by Paul Rugg) – A loud, obnoxious man who often interrupts the story to give background information on villains (as seen in the episodes introducing Cobra Queen and Longhorn), or to describe, rather than show, the ending of an episode (demonstrated in "Candle Jack"). He is a parody of the radio personality of the same name.

 Lonnie Tallbutt (voiced by Mitch Schauer in human form, Jim Cummings in werewolf form) – A werewolf that begs Dexter for help. His name is a combination of that of Lon Chaney, Jr. and Lawrence Talbot, the character Chaney played in the 1941 movie The Wolf Man. He is prone to grabbing people's shirt collars and yelling "You don't understand!"

 Emmitt Nervend – A short, hunchbacked man with straw-like hair and a frozen grimace who usually shows up at least once an episode, always in the opening credits, but usually in the background. He stands looking at the camera (as pictured), never saying a word. The end credits often contain a credit revealing how many times Emmitt can be found in a particular episode. His appearance was drawn by Mitch Schauer.

 Weena Mercator as the Hopping Woman – A person acknowledged whenever credits are used in an episode.

 Yakko Warner (voiced by Rob Paulsen) – The oldest brother of the Animaniacs.

 Wakko Warner (voiced by Jess Harnell) – The younger brother of the Animaniacs.

 Dot Warner (voiced by Tress MacNeille) – The youngest sister of the Animaniacs.

 The Brain (voiced by Maurice LaMarche) – A megalomaniacal genius lab mouse from Pinky and the Brain.

Mini-segments
Freakazoid! also features several mini-segments, primarily in the first season. Each of these have their own theme songs and title cards, and rarely "cross over" into the continuity of the main show. These segments include:

 Lord Bravery – Nigel Skunkthorpe (voiced by Jeff Bennett impersonating John Cleese) is a superhero from the United Kingdom in an outfit slightly resembling that of a Roman soldier. He does not do much in the way of superheroics; in fact, he is very snooty, cynical and unwilling to do unpleasant tasks in the course of his duties, such as entering a sewer to perform a rescue. Likewise, he gets little respect and recognition as a superhero from the general public and even from his wife and mother-in-law, with whom he lives. At one point, he loses his name due to a trademark dispute with a bakery and changes it to Lord Smoked Meats and Fishes. His theme song is delivered in the style of Gilbert and Sullivan's song "A British Tar". In "Freak-a-Panel", he was among the characters that confront Freakazoid over being dropped from the show, and was given a job washing the Freakmobile.

 The Huntsman – The Huntsman (voiced by Jeff Bennett impersonating Charlton Heston) is an imagining of what Robin Hood would be like if he was portrayed by Charlton Heston. He can never find enough crime to fight and secretly suspects that the police are hiding crimes from him because they do not trust him. It is also possible that he was so good at being a superhero that his villains simply gave up trying. The Huntsman was once a hunter called Marty Feeb who saved a chunky elf from being eaten by a crow. The elf rewarded Marty Feeb with a magic sack of corn, which gave him enhanced strength and speed, as well as shiny teeth, resulting in him becoming the Huntsman. He also has a brother called Hector Feeb, who he claims lives in a townhouse. The Huntsman can be summoned by a police officer blowing into the Horn of Urgency on top of the local police station. When he appears before the police lieutenant Artie King (voiced by Dorian Harewood), the Huntsman is told in those two episodes that either a rookie mistakenly blew the horn or the blowing of the horn was a false alarm. His trademark phrase is "Darn the luck, darn!" His sketches are often themed around beginning with a lengthy, overly heroic opener, with a title that would indicate an action-oriented episode, that ends up being a short anticlimactic skit of the Huntsman not being needed after all. In one of his episodes, it was mentioned that he had fought the Lobe and Cave Guy and he is shown fighting Cave Guy and Candle Jack in his opening. He is also an umpire in the annual Superheroes/Villain All-Star Benefit Softball Game. In "The Freakazoid", the Huntsman gives a request to Freakazoid to help him find work and also lost the address to the superhero convention being held on some moon. In "Freak-a-Panel", he was among the characters that confront Freakazoid over being dropped from the show, and was given a job washing the Freakmobile.

 The Lawn Gnomes – Baffeardin (voiced by Clive Revill), Huska (voiced by Carl Ballantine), Honna (voiced by Rose Marie), and Quist (voiced by Larry Gelman) are a group of gnomes-turned-lawn gnomes that come to life at night in a parody of Gargoyles. Infamous for their mischief back in 995 AD, they were advised by the Great Mystic Gnome (voiced by Roscoe Lee Browne) to change their ways before it gets worse for them. After planning to do so in a week, the four gnomes were cursed to become stone by day by the powerful wizard Rathgar (voiced by Maurice LaMarche) after they tripped him and previously attacked his younger Viking brother Erik the Large (also voiced by LaMarche). They would revert at night during which time they were given the opportunity to mend their ways by fighting evil, after which the curse would be lifted. During this one-time sketch, Freakazoid did his commentary on it.

 Toby Danger – A parody of Jonny Quest, featuring the voices of Scott Menville, Don Messick (in his last role before his death), and Granville Van Dusen (all of whom provided voices for JQ), that was originally written by Tom Minton as a 12-minute stand-alone short for Animaniacs, but slotted into Freakazoid! to fill time.

 Fatman and Boy Blubber – The misadventures of two morbidly obese superheroes (voiced by Marc Drotman and Paul Rugg, respectively), in a parody of the Batman TV series. Their only segment involves them coming to the aid of Louis (voiced by Scott Menville), an overweight boy who loves sweet buns and is being tormented by bullies. After attempting to capture the bullies and failing due to their extreme lack of physical fitness, Fatman and Boy Blubber deliver a pseudo-inspirational speech to Louis about their own struggles with being overweight, and how they often end up eating fast food and snacks instead of having sensible meals. When Louis asks what the point of the speech is, Fatman changes the subject to ask if Louis has anymore sweet buns in his lunchbox; the hero then tries to confiscate the food and begins beating Louis up with Boy Blubber when he refuses to give the sweet buns to them. Fatman and Boy Blubber also briefly appear in "Hero Boy" reading a storybook to some children. When he asked a kid if she was going to eat the food she has with her, she nods "no". When Fatman asks if he can have it, she nods "yes".

Production

Voicing
The voice actors of the show Freakazoid! included various actors from other television series and films. Tress MacNeille, Maurice LaMarche, Jeff Bennett, and Frank Welker, who all provided voices in the series Animaniacs, were on Freakazoid!. Actors Ed Asner, Ricardo Montalbán, Larry Cedar, Jonathan Harris, and Stephen Furst also provided voices for the series. Also, writers John P. McCann and Paul Rugg (who played Freakazoid) added voices themselves.

Casting for the show had been difficult for the Freakazoid! staff, as no lead character had been found even after extensive auditions. Eventually, when writer Paul Rugg was brought to demonstrate the voice in a recording session, he ended up filling the role, as he said: "I went in there and did it. Then they played it for Steven Spielberg and he said 'Yep! Fine, sure, great,' and then I panicked ... and I had to do it." Rugg played the role of Freakazoid through the entire series run.

Animation
The animation was outsourced to Animal-ya, Studio Junio, and Tama Production in Japan, Seoul Movie, Dong Yang Animation, and Koko Enterprises Ltd. in South Korea.

Music
The music for Freakazoid! was written by Richard Stone, Steve Bernstein, Julie Bernstein, Gordon Goodwin, and Tim Kelly. Stone won a Daytime Emmy with lyricist (and senior producer) Tom Ruegger for the main title song in 1996. Julie Bernstein was nominated for a Daytime Emmy for Outstanding Original Song in 1998 for the song "Invisibo" from the episode Freak-a-Panel.

Controversy with Mike Allred's Madman
Cartoonist Mike Allred has criticized the show and its lead character as plagiarism of his comic book Madman, asserting that the title characters share several personality traits, and wear similar costumes featuring a chest emblem including an exclamation mark. During the short run of the show, Allred remained relatively silent on the subject, but in 2003, he responded to a question about the show on the message board of his official website:

Humor
The humor in Freakazoid! relied heavily on slapstick, parody and pop culture references. Due to the series being metafiction, much of the series was self-aware humor (i.e. breaking the fourth wall); for instance, after the first appearance of the Freakmobile, the show goes immediately into an impromptu commercial for a toy version, and later in the episode, Freakazoid addresses an audience, congratulating the staff on how hard they have worked to make the show toyetic. A running gag involves a repeated credit for "Weena Mercator as the Hopping Woman", though no such character appears in any episode. The show also incorporated humor aimed at the WB Network, such as questioning the meaning of the initials "WB".

Freakazoid! made frequent use of stock footage, including a peaceful scene of a field of flowers ("Relax-O-Vision"), numerous people screaming and traditionally dressed Bavarians dancing and slapping each other ("Candle Jack"), and a man being shot in the belly with a cannonball and a man wrestling a bear ("The Chip").

Cameo appearances were also a major element of the show's humor. At various times, Freakazoid! hosted appearances by characters from other Warner Bros. shows such as Pinky and the Brain, Animaniacs and even an insinuation appearance of Batman from Bruce Timm's animated version. Portrayals of many celebrities (including producer Steven Spielberg) and guest appearances by such figures as Jack Valenti, Leonard Maltin and Mark Hamill as themselves were also commonplace. Norm Abram had an entire episode, "Normadeus", built around him. One original character, a bizarre-looking man named Emmitt Nervend, plays no role whatsoever other than enabling a Where's Waldo-esque hunt for his constant cameos (complete with the number of his appearances announced in the closing credits).

One of the show's longest cameo appearances was when Wakko from Animaniacs and the Brain from Pinky and the Brain appeared in a scene in which they argue with Freakazoid over which of their shows is Steven Spielberg's favorite, with Freakazoid arguing that his show was the favorite (Tiny Toon Adventures was not represented in the discussion as it was on Nickelodeon at the time, while the others were on Kids' WB). However, when the trio confronts Steven over the issue, he simply replies: "Who are you people?".

History

Creation

Freakazoid! was created by animators Bruce Timm, who had previously produced Batman: The Animated Series, and his writing partner Paul Dini, who was also a story editor for Tiny Toon Adventures. Timm was called upon by Steven Spielberg, who Timm said "liked" Timm's Batman series, to help create a new superhero show. After a meeting with Spielberg, Timm said that Spielberg had "really liked" the idea for the series, after which Timm and Dini created the character Freakazoid, an edgy superhero with a manic personality. Timm came up with the name for the character naturally, as he recalled, "The name 'Freakazoid' just kind of jumped out of me, I don't even know where from. I said 'Oh, yeah, 'Freakazoid', that might be an interesting name.'" Dini and Timm have also discussed their desire to create a TV show about The Creeper, another DC comics character who shares as similar comedic style to Freakazoid!, which it would later evolve into.

Timm originally created Freakazoid! to be a serious "adventure show" with some comedic undertones. However, his initial idea for the series did not come to be, as he stated:

After Timm left the series, Tom Ruegger, who developed the other Spielberg series Tiny Toon Adventures and Animaniacs, was brought in to re-develop the series Timm had created "from the ground up". Ruegger's version of the series used some of Timm's designs and concepts, but Timm said that the series was "radically altered" to become the comedy series that was more to Spielberg's liking.

Ruegger then began writing stories for the series, and came up with a pile of very short segments. Spielberg liked what Ruegger had written, but wanted longer stories for the series as well. Ruegger then asked writers John McCann and Paul Rugg to come onto the series to write longer, more elaborate stories for the series and, according to Rugg, "(...) figure out what this [Freakazoid!] was going to be, and the answer was like, 'We didn't know', and still don't".

Premiere, cancellation, and syndication

Freakazoid! premiered on Kids' WB's Saturday lineup on September 9, 1995. During its run, Freakazoid! came across problems of appealing to its target demographic, young children. Tom Ruegger said that Freakazoid! had done poorly in ratings because the audience that the series gathered was older than the target audience. Also, Freakazoid ran into timeslot problems. Writer John McCann said that the time slot of the series changed frequently: "They put it at eight o' clock in the morning, 3:30 in the afternoon, they shifted it all around; we couldn't even find it, and we wrote the thing". The series ran on Kids' WB until February 14, 1997, when it was canceled due to poor ratings, airing only one complete season and part of a second season. Rugg said the series' demise was the result of a combination of people not understanding the series, time slot changes, appealing to the wrong demographics, and that "(...) there aren't a lot of Nielsen boxes in federal prisons. Had there been, I'm telling you, we'd still be on the air today". However, the show was later picked up by Cartoon Network and was rebroadcast from April 5, 1997, until March 29, 2003. The series had a total number of 24 episodes. In 2006, Freakazoid! was one of the shows scheduled to be broadcast on the AOL broadband channel, In2TV. The show is currently available to stream for free on Tubi. In Italy, Freakazoid! along with Tiny Toon Adventures, Animaniacs and Pinky and the Brain, was shown on RAI and later Mediaset. In Japan, Freakazoid! along with Tiny Toon Adventures was shown on TV Asahi.

Reception
The series won a Daytime Emmy Award for Outstanding Special Class Animated Program.

Bruce Timm said that the series still has a cult following of fans who ask him questions about the series whenever they meet him.

According to Timm, the character's co-creator, he actually has a preference for the second season:

Video on demand

United States
As of June 2022, the series is currently available to stream for free in the United States on Tubi. It is also available to purchase on DVD and digital stores. In Latin America, the show streams on HBO Max.

International
The entire series is currently available for purchase on Amazon Prime Video in Italy.

Merchandise

Print
Freakazoid never had his own comic book, but he did make a special guest crossover in issue #35 of the Animaniacs comic book published by DC Comics.

Home video
Warner Home Video has released the entire series on DVD in Region 1.

In popular culture
The sixth season episode of Teen Titans Go!, "Huggbees", aired on November 14, 2020, and features Freakazoid helping the Teen Titans defeat the Lobe and Brain when they join forces. It was mentioned by Freakazoid that Steven Spielberg would have to approve the crossover which led to Robin sending a message to Steven who approves of the crossover. According to Rugg, the production team for the show had sent him a script involving Freakazoid in December 2019 which he approved. The episode has Rugg, David Warner, Ed Asner, and Joe Leahy reprising their respective roles.

References

Further reading

External links

 
Freakazoid! at Don Markstein's Toonopedia. Archived from the original on July 30, 2016.

1995 American television series debuts
1997 American television series endings
1990s American animated television series
1990s American comic science fiction television series
American animated television spin-offs
American children's animated adventure television series
American children's animated comic science fiction television series
American children's animated superhero television series
Crossover animated television series
English-language television shows
Kids' WB original shows
Metafictional television series
Parody superheroes
Self-reflexive television
Teen animated television series
Teen superhero television series
Television series by Amblin Entertainment
Television series by Warner Bros. Animation
Television series created by Tom Ruegger
Television shows set in Washington, D.C.
The WB original programming
Comedy franchises